The first Croatian telenovela is Villa Maria (2004–2005).

List

Categories 
Telenovelas
Croatia
Television shows set in Croatia
Television shows filmed in Croatia